The 2019 SAFF U-18 Championship was be the 3rd edition of the SAFF U-18 Championship, an international football competition for men's under-18 national teams organized by SAFF. The tournament will be hosted by Nepal from September 20 to 29 September 2019.

Nepal were the defending champions, having won both the previous editions in 2015 and 2017, however they lost in Group Stage.

Squads
Players born on or after 1 January 2001 are eligible to compete in the tournament. Each team have to register a squad of minimum 18 players and maximum 23 players, minimum three of whom had to be goalkeepers.

Participating teams
Pakistan had sent their entry for the meet and they were placed in Group A. However, due to failure to appoint a normalisation committee federation, they withdrew from the tournament.

Officials

Referees
 Virendha Rai (Bhutan)
 Mohamed Anisur Rahman (Bangladesh)
 Ashwin Kumar (India)
 Abdulla Sathir (Maldives)
 Kabin Byanjankar (Nepal)
 Ashantha Dias Ponhen Adeege (Sri Lanka)

Assistant Referees
 Tashi Dendup (Bhutan)
 Md Shafiqul Islam (Bangladesh)
 Sanjay E.S. (India)
 Zaheer Hussain (Maldives)
 Yunal Malla (Nepal)
 Dhanushka Sampath Liyanagunawardana (Sri Lanka)

Group stage
All matches will be played at Kathmandu, Nepal.
Times listed are UTC+05:45.

Group A

Group B

Bracket

Knockout stage
Times listed are UTC+05:45.

Semi-finals

Third place match

Final

Goalscorers

Winner

Broadcasting rights

References

2019
2019 in Asian football
2019–20 in Nepalese football
2019–20 in Indian football
2019 in Bhutanese football
2019 in Bangladeshi football
2019 in Maldivian football
2019–20 in Pakistani football 
2019–20 in Sri Lankan football 
2019 in youth association football
September 2019 sports events in Asia
2019